George W. Swain (March 5, 1824 – June 17, 1904) was a member of the Wisconsin State Senate.

Biography
Born in Sanbornton, New Hampshire, Swain moved to Bristol, Dane County, Wisconsin in 1853.

Swain married Hannah Chase (1825–1895) in 1849. They had four children.

Career
Swain was the founder of Chaseburg, Wisconsin, having platted the town in 1863. He was its treasurer in 1866, and supervisor of Vernon County, Wisconsin in 1870. Swain represented the 4th district of the Senate from 1878 to 1879. He was a Republican.

In the mid 1880s, Swain moved to Ashton, South Dakota, where he remained until his death from heart failure at the age of 80.

References

External links

People from Sanbornton, New Hampshire
People from Dane County, Wisconsin
People from Vernon County, Wisconsin
Republican Party Wisconsin state senators
1824 births
1904 deaths
19th-century American politicians